Tashima (written: 田嶋 or 田島 lit. "field island") is a Japanese surname. Notable people with the surname include:

A. Wallace Tashima (born 1934), American judge
Chris Tashima (born 1960), American actor and film director
, Japanese footballer
, Japanese singer and idol
, Japanese footballer

See also
Tajima (disambiguation)

Japanese-language surnames